The Great Ireland Run is an annual 10-kilometre road running competition which is held in Phoenix Park, Dublin, Ireland in mid-April. It is part of the Great Run series of athletics competitions. It is sponsored by SPAR and features both an elite race and a popular race.

The 10 km race course begins at Chesterfield Avenue and loops around in a clock-wise circuit to finish on Furze Road. A 2.5 km fun run for 8–15-year-old runners is also featured on the programme of events. Over 11,000 people took part in the day's events in 2010. The elite races in 2010 also doubled up as the Irish 10K Championships.

Past participants have included former marathon world record holder Paul Tergat, and World Championship medalist Craig Mottram, as well as some of Ireland's foremost athletes such as 1995 World Champion Sonia O'Sullivan and cross country specialist Catherina McKiernan. The course record holders are both Ethiopian – Kenenisa Bekele with his 27:49-minute run in 2012 and Meselech Melkamu with her record of 31:41 set in 2006.

Past winners
Key:

Statistics

Winners by country

Multiple winners

References

List of winners
Race History. Great Ireland Run. Retrieved on 2010-04-25.

Athletics in Dublin (city)
Recurring sporting events established in 2003
2003 establishments in Ireland
Annual events in Ireland
Phoenix Park
Spring (season) events in the Republic of Ireland